Walter Jens (8 March 1923 – 9 June 2013) was a German philologist, literature historian, critic, university professor and writer.

He was born in Hamburg, and attended the Gelehrtenschule des Johanneums from 1933 to 1941, when he gained his Abitur, before studying at the University of Hamburg. 

In the early 1940s, Jens joined the NSDAP. He denied having applied for membership actively and claimed that he had become a member automatically because he was a member of the Hitler Youth and that he never received a membership card.

During World War II, he earned a doctorate in Freiburg with a work about Sophocles' tragedy and habilitated at age 26 with the work Tacitus und die Freiheit (Tacitus and Freedom) at the University of Tübingen.

From 1950 onward, he was a member of the Group 47. That year, he had his breakthrough with the novel Nein. Die Welt der Angeklagten.

From 1965 to 1988, Jens held the chair for General Rhetoric at the University of Tübingen, which was created in order to keep him at the university. Under the pseudonym Momos, he wrote television reviews for Die Zeit. From 1976 to 1982, he was president of the International PEN center in Germany. From 1989 to 1997, he was president of the Academy of Arts, Berlin, and afterwards he was the honorary president. From 1990 to 1995, he was chairman of the Martin-Niemöller-Foundation.

Personal life
In 1951, Jens married Inge Puttfarcken. They had two sons, Tillmann und Christoph. Jens suffered from dementia, which began to manifest in 2004. He died in 2013 in Tübingen, aged 90.

Honours and awards
Source:

 1951: Prize of Amis de la Liberté
 1959: German Youth Literature Prize
 1968: Lessing Prize of the Free and Hanseatic City of Hamburg
 1981: Heinrich Heine Prize of the city of Düsseldorf
 1982: Honorary President of the PEN Centre of the Federal Republic of Germany
 1983: Austrian Merit
 1984: Adolf Grimme Award
 1988: Alternative Büchner Prize
 1988:  (with his wife Inge Jens)
 1989: Hermann Sinsheimer Award
 1990: Austrian State Prize for Cultural Journalism
 1992: Austrian Decoration for Science and Art
 1992: Poetry Foundation Visiting Professor at the Goethe University, Frankfurt am Main
 1997: Bruno Snell sticker for outstanding work in science and society at the University of Hamburg
 1997: Honorary President of the Berlin University of the Arts
 1998: 
 2002: Ecumenical Sermon Prize (Predigtpreis) awarded by German publisher Verlags für die Deutsche Wirtschaft
 2003: Grand Merit Cross of the Order of Merit of the Federal Republic of Germany
 2003: Corine Literature Prize (with Inge Jens)

References

External links

1923 births
2013 deaths
Writers from Hamburg
German philologists
German literary historians
German literary critics
Knights Commander of the Order of Merit of the Federal Republic of Germany
Members of the Academy of Arts, Berlin
Recipients of the Austrian State Prize
Recipients of the Austrian Decoration for Science and Art
German male non-fiction writers
University of Hamburg alumni
University of Tübingen alumni
People educated at the Gelehrtenschule des Johanneums
Nazi Party members
Hitler Youth members
Deaths from dementia in Germany